Marcus Bentley (born 4 October 1967) is a British actor, broadcaster and voice-over artist. Bentley is most known for narrating the UK version of the Dutch reality television programme Big Brother since its inception in 2000, until the series' end in 2018. He also did other continuity announcements for Channel 4 until he left in July 2011 to continue narrating the revived Big Brother on Channel 5. Bentley's voice-over work and distinctive Geordie accent has led to him becoming one of Britain's most recognised voices.

Bentley has also appeared on stage and in London's Burning. Although he rarely makes public appearances, his public profile has been raised since Big Brothers revival on Channel 5.

Early life
Bentley was born in Gateshead, County Durham, and brought up in Stockton-on-Tees, County Durham. He attended East 15 Acting School.

Big Brother
Bentley was selected as the narrator of the Channel 4 (2000–2010) and Channel 5 (2011–2018) reality television programme Big Brother, which originated in the Netherlands, and this remains his best-known work. The producers of Big Brother gave him the job of narrator because they liked the way he said "Chickens". His most notable catchphrase is "Day [x] (in the Big Brother house...)". Bentley has narrated all nineteen series of the show to date, as well as the spin-off shows Celebrity Big Brother, Teen Big Brother, Celebrity Hijack and Ultimate Big Brother. 

Despite not being confirmed, Bentley is expected to narrate Big Brother again following the announcement that ITV2 would be reviving the show in 2023, stating in news reports that he had been having calls and updates from producers.

Other work
Before Big Brother, Bentley starred in several TV adaptations of Catherine Cookson's novels where he honed his now familiar Teesside accent. He also starred in several TV commercials as well as minor parts in feature films, such as Mad Dogs and Englishmen, which starred Joss Ackland, C. Thomas Howell, and Elizabeth Hurley.

Aside from Big Brother, Bentley could be heard on Channel 4 as a continuity announcer until he left after ten years, when he reprised his Big Brother narrator role on the revived Channel 5 series.

Another of Bentley's roles is the unseen question master on Sky One quiz show, Dirty Money.

Channel 5
From December 2011, Bentley began doing continuity links on Channel 5, complementing his role as narrator of Big Brother on the same channel.

Personal life
Bentley married his wife Jools in 1997. The couple have three children, and live in Kent.

References

External links 
Marcus Bentley – TV Tome

1967 births
Living people
20th-century English male actors
21st-century English male actors
Alumni of East 15 Acting School
English game show hosts
English male television actors
English male voice actors
Actors from Gateshead
Actors from Stockton-on-Tees
Actors from County Durham